Riko Fujita (born 29 September 1997) is a Japanese professional footballer who plays as a defender for WE League club AC Nagano Parceiro Ladies.

Club career 
Fujita made her WE League debut on 12 September 2021.

References 

Living people
1997 births
Women's association football defenders
WE League players
Japanese women's footballers
Association football people from Chiba Prefecture
AC Nagano Parceiro Ladies players